Arthur Gardner (born Arthur Goldberg; June 7, 1910 – December 19, 2014) was an American actor and film producer. He was known for his television western, The Rifleman. He was a voting member of the Academy of Motion Picture Arts and Sciences.

Early life
Gardner was born Arthur Goldberg in Marinette, Wisconsin, and raised in an upper-middle-class Jewish family. He started his show business career as an actor when he was 18 years old. In 1929 he arrived in Hollywood, where Carl Laemmle employed him as an extra for the film studio Universal. One of his first roles was as a student in 1930's All Quiet on the Western Front. He was the last surviving member of the cast and crew. Gardner and Luise Rainer were in 1938's Dramatic School, and, up until his death two weeks before Rainer, were the last two surviving members, both at the age of 104.

During World War II, Gardner served in the Army Air Forces' First Motion Picture Unit in Culver City, California. Like many Jewish actors at the time, he changed his name because of fears of anti-Semitism. There he met Jules Levy and Arnold Laven. The three formed the Levy-Gardner-Laven production company in 1951. Gardner's producing credits include the television series The Rifleman (1958–1963) and The Big Valley (1965–1969). His feature film credits include 1974's McQ and 1975's Brannigan, both starring John Wayne.

Personal life 
Gardner lived in Beverly Hills, California from 1963 until his death there on December 19, 2014, at the age of 104. His son Steve Gardner is an attorney. His son Douglas is an assistant director.

See also
List of centenarians (actors, filmmakers and entertainers)

References

External links
 
 
 Oscars' oldest voter, 101, offers link to Hollywood's Golden Age - Los Angeles Times article
 TV pioneer reaches milestone - Variety article

1910 births
2014 deaths
People from Marinette, Wisconsin
Male actors from Beverly Hills, California
Male actors from Wisconsin
Film producers from California
American centenarians
Jewish American male actors
First Motion Picture Unit personnel
American male film actors
Film producers from Wisconsin
Men centenarians
21st-century American Jews